Gerald A. Lawrence (born July 26, 1939) is a Canadian radio broadcaster and politician. He was the MLA for Halifax St. Margarets in the Nova Scotia House of Assembly from 1978 to 1993, and served in the Executive Council of Nova Scotia.

Background
Due to polio Lawrence become a paraplegic at the age of 12. He married Shelia Wooden in 1963.

Employment history
Jerry "Jer Bear" Lawrence was a Metro Halifax radio personality on 96CHNS with his show Hello Metro. First employed in October 1959 as radio operator at CJCH Halifax, Lawrence started his on-air radio career in the summer of 1964. He later became the morning host on CJCH from 1967 to 1976. He then moved to Country 101 CHFX in 1976 but then returned part-time to CJCH. In 1985 he became the morning host at CHNS. Lawrence retired from broadcasting in 1995.

His morning signature show, Hello Metro, ran for over twenty years on three different radio stations in the metro area.

Political career
In 1974, Lawrence won a seat as Alderman for the city of Halifax, and in 1978 was elected to the Nova Scotia Legislature. He was re-elected in the 1981, 1984, and 1988 elections. On June 22, 1979, Lawrence was appointed to the Executive Council of Nova Scotia as Minister of Government Services. He served in the role until November 26, 1985, when he was replaced by Mike Laffin. Lawrence was to be sworn in as minister without portfolio the same day, but resigned from the cabinet. Lawrence was instrumental in getting the Nova Scotia Government to support handicapped parking and making Halifax - Dartmouth and Nova Scotia more "handicapped friendly" during his time in government.1978-1993. Under his portfolio installed elevator in Province House making the Nova Scotia Legislature accessible for the first time for those who are disabled.

Honours
 1975 Eric Spicer Award as Halifax/Dartmouth's most outstanding citizen
 1976 Vanier Award as one of five outstanding young Canadians
 1980 Stairs Award as Nova Scotia's outstanding paraplegic
 1988 Ice Capades Good Skate Award for community involvement
 1995 the Canada Medal awarded by the Governor General
 2002 Inducted to the Canadian Broadcasting Hall of Fame (CAB)
 2005 Queen's Golden Jubilee Medal by the Premier of Nova Scotia
 2007 Inducted into the Maritime Motorsports Hall of Fame Founder and first President of Atlantic Motorsport Karters Association.
 2009 Lewis Lake Park was renamed Jerry Lawrence Provincial Park
 Honorary member of the International Firefighters Union
 One of the founding members of the Halifax "Flying Wheels" wheelchair basketball team 1958–59.
 Founder and manager of the Championship Bob McDonald "Chevys" baseball team 1967-1972
 Honorary member of many automobile clubs including the Halifax Antique Car Club.
 Founder of the original IWK "250" stock car race at Riverside Speedway in Antigonish N.S. 1977.The race has contributed over $500,000 to the Children's Hospital since its inception.
 Honorary Chairman of the World Wheelchair basketball championships in Halifax N.S. 1980.
 First paraplegic to be named to the Executive Council of Nova Scotia 1979,Minister of Public Works.
 2022 Awarded the Order of Canada

References

1939 births
Living people
People from Halifax, Nova Scotia
Progressive Conservative Association of Nova Scotia MLAs
Members of the Executive Council of Nova Scotia
Canadian radio hosts